The Edson Keith Estate (also known as the Phillippi Estate Park or Phillippi Plantation) is a historic site in Sarasota, Florida. It is located at 5500 South Tamiami Trail. The home's construction was finalized in 1916. On March 14, 1991, it was added to the U.S. National Register of Historic Places.

History

Precursors 
William Joel Drumright would buy 40 acres along Phillippi Creek from the Florida Land and Improvement Company owned by Hamilton Disston at a price of $50 in 1883. Eight years later he would get an extra 78 acres by homesteading it. He would be politically active serving on Manatee County's Democratic Executive Committee by turn of the 20th century. Later on he would be the Socialist Party's candidate for Clerk of the Circuit Court in 1904. Drumright would end up selling his land to George H. and C. Woodburn Matheny in 1910 who would plat a subdivision named Phillippi Park the next year.

Estate 
Edison Keith Jr. would buy 8 subdivision lots in the Phillippi Park subdivision in 1915 for $7,000 with constructing starting on the residence during the summer of 1916. Original buildings that remain from the estate are the home for servants, a garden shed and a garage. Other buildings that were once on the property included a water tower, home for a chauffeur and a variety of sheds for farming related activities. Keith would die in 1939 and his wife would sell the land to Mae Hansen Prodie, a doll clothing designer from Chicago. Prodie's husband would operate the property as a luxury inn during the 1950s. Prodie would retire in the 1960s and reside in the home and when she died in 1986, Sarasota County would buy the land to be used as a park through a bond referendum.

Gallery

See also
Harriet F. Rees House, also owned by the Keiths

References and external links

 Sarasota County listings at National Register of Historic Places
 Sarasota County listings at Florida's Office of Cultural and Historical Programs

Houses on the National Register of Historic Places in Sarasota County, Florida
Houses in Sarasota, Florida
Houses completed in 1916